FK Sakuona is a Lithuanian football team from Plikiai in Klaipėda region.

History

The first football club in Plikiai was established in 1919 under the name SV Plicken. 

The current club was established in 1988 and called Švyturys, by the name of kolkhoz where it was located. After the independence, the club was renamed to SK Plikiai in 1992. Recently, for sponsorship reasons the club bore names Sakuona and Rūgpienių kaimas.

FK Plikiai won 2001/2002 the LFF III Lyga championship and were promoted to the LFF II Lyga. In 2009/2010 season FK Plikiai made headlines by reaching the LFF Cup quarterfinals having eliminated famous FK Žalgiris..

Previous names

 1988  – Švyturys
 1992  – Liverpulis
 1998  – SK Plikiai
 2002  – Sakuona

Achievements
 Winners of LFF III Lyga
 2001-22, 2018, 2019, 2021

 Runners up of LFF II Lyga
 2006, 2007-08, 2010-11

References

Football clubs in Lithuania
Association football clubs established in 1988
1988 establishments in Lithuania